

The CAMS 33 was a reconnaissance flying boat built in France in the early 1920s.  It was designed in response to a French Navy requirement for new flying boats for various roles.

Design and development
Chantiers Aéro-Maritimes de la Seine (CAMS) submitted prototype aircraft in two categories for the Navy requirement - as both a reconnaissance aircraft and a transport.  The design was a conventional biplane flying boat with equal-span unstaggered wings and two engines mounted in a single nacelle in tractor-pusher configuration on struts in the interplane gap.  Accommodation consisted of an open cockpit for two, plus open bow and dorsal gun positions on the reconnaissance machine, or an enclosed cabin for seven passengers on the transport version.

Operational history
The transport (33C or 33T) was passed over, but the armed reconnaissance version was accepted for production as the 33B.  Twelve aircraft were eventually produced for the French Navy, these equipping Escadrille 1R1 at Cherbourg-Chantereyne. Yugoslavia purchased another six machines.  The 33T prototype flew under civil registration for a few years, but was unable to attract customers.

Operators

French Navy

Specifications (33B)

References

Notes

Bibliography

 Taylor, John W. R. and Jean Alexander. Combat Aircraft of the World. New York: G.P. Putnam's Sons, 1969. . 
 Taylor, Michael J. H. Jane's Encyclopedia of Aviation. London: Studio Editions, 1989. .   
 World Aircraft Information Files. London: Bright Star Publishing, File 891, Sheet 02.

33
1920s French military reconnaissance aircraft
Flying boats
Biplanes
Twin-engined push-pull aircraft
Aircraft first flown in 1923